Florindo J. Fabrizio (November 1, 1944 – July 24, 2018) was an American politician, Democratic member of the Pennsylvania House of Representatives, representing the 2nd District. He was elected in 2002 and served until his death on July 24, 2018.

References

External links
Pennsylvania House of Representatives - Florindo J. Fabrizio official PA House website

1944 births
2018 deaths
Democratic Party members of the Pennsylvania House of Representatives
Politicians from Erie, Pennsylvania
Edinboro University of Pennsylvania alumni
Pennsylvania State University alumni
American stockbrokers
21st-century American politicians